Click, Clack, Splish, Splash: A Counting Adventure is a children's picture book written by Doreen Cronin and is illustrated by Betsy Lewin. Released in 2006 by Atheneum Books, it is one of the sequels to Click, Clack, Moo: Cows That Type.

Plot
While the farmer sleeps on the couch close to the fishing tank, Duck and the barnyard animals sneak into the house on a quiet mission that involves "3 buckets piled high" outside the window and "4 chickens standing by". At the end of the book, the reader finds out that Duck's plan was the liberate the farmer's fish.

Reception
A Publishers Weekly review says, "Though not quite as charming as its abecedarian cousin, this slight volume still offers a comical introduction to numerals one through 10. Lewin's black-outlined menagerie is as breezy as ever, tiptoeing, climbing or splashing through lots of white space to the final destination". A Kirkus Reviews review says, "A must-have sequel to all of Duck's adventures". Rosalyn Pierini, of School Library Journal reviewed the book saying, " A great tool for parents and teachers seeking to make learning fun".

References

2006 children's books
American picture books
Sequel books
Children's fiction books
Fictional ducks
Books about ducks
Atheneum Books books